Mateus Oliveira may refer to:

 Mateus Vicente de Oliveira (1706-1786), Portuguese architect
 Mateus Oliveira (footballer, born 1994), Brazilian football defensive midfielder
 Mateus Oliveira (footballer, born 1995), Brazilian football forward

See also
 Matheus Oliveira (disambiguation)